Royal Kaliber was a Dutch Warmblood stallion that competed at the Grand Prix level of show jumping, and was part of the United States Show Jumping Team at the 2004 Athens Olympic Games.

Show jumping Career
American Chris Kappler first began riding the Dutch Warmblood when the horse was 8, after receiving him from Ben Boessen. Boessen trained the horse for the large competitions. Kappler rode him to several impressive wins, and Royal Kaliber was named 2002-2003 AGA Horse of the Year and 2003 U.S. Equestrian Horse of the Year.

2004 Olympic Games
Royal Kaliber was a part of the US Show Jumping Team at the 2004 Athens Olympics, winners of the team silver medal. However, while jumping in the final round of the individual competition, he had an awkward landing from the 15th fence on course, a large oxer. Kappler felt his mount take an odd step and, with only two fences to go, pulled him up and dismounted. A diagnosis by the team veterinarian found that the horse had an acute strain to his superficial digital flexor tendon of his left foreleg. This made him the third show jumping horse to be injured, which brought up questions of the suitability of the footing. Royal Kaliber was pulled from competition, but his previous effort had still earned him the individual bronze. It was decided to keep the stallion in Europe until he had completely recovered from his injury, before shipping him home. Following the disqualification of gold medalist, Cian O'Connor of Ireland, for a drug infraction, Kappler and Royal Kaliber were finally awarded the individual silver medal, with Rodrigo Pessoa moving up to the gold-medal position.

Resulting colic
Royal Kaliber's leg was said to be healing very well following the Games. However, the horse began experiencing problems with colic, and an ultrasound was performed finding intestinal adhesion. The veterinarians Dr. Jack Snyder and Dr. Barry David (who flew in from the United States) and Dr. Edwin Enzerink deemed that surgery was appropriate, and on 27 September 2004, they performed the procedure at the Veterinair Centrum Someren in Someren, the Netherlands. Finding the intestine adhered to the spleen, they removed parts of both the large and small intestine. Royal Kaliber appeared stable after the surgery, but his health worsened on 6 October. The veterinary team performed another surgery, and found that further adhesions had occurred, which were non-repairable. The decision was then made to euthanize him on 8 October 2004.

Offspring
By chance, a sample of Royal Kaliber's semen was collected for approval testing. Using the surplus, it was possible to breed a few mares, and the result was four offspring: one was sold to Europe, one given as a gift to trainer Frank Chapot, one to a client of Chapot's, and a filly was kept by the owners of Royal Kaliber.

Accomplishments
2004
 Team gold and individual silver medal at the Athens Olympics
 2nd $60,000 Idle Dice Classic (Wellington, Florida)

2003
 Team gold and individual silver medal at the Pan American Games (Dominican Republic)
 1st Grand Prix at Devon (Devon, PA)
 1st $200,000 Budweiser American Invitational (Tampa, FL)
 1st AGA Show Jumping Championships (Wellington, FL)
 Named U.S. Equestrian Horse of the Year and American Grand Prix Association Horse of the Year
      
2002
 1st $175,000 Cargill Grand Prix of the United States (San Juan Capistrano, CA)
 1st $52,100 Bayer/USET Wellington Cup (Wellington, FL)
 1st $50,000 Bayer/USET Wellington Cup (Wellington, FL)
 1st $60,000 Budweiser American Gold Cup (Devon, PA)

2001
 2nd $75,000 Ford Idle Dice Classic
 2nd $200,000 Budweiser American Invitational
 2nd $75,000 Kilkenny Internationale Cup (Wellington, FL)

Pedigree

References

Show jumping horses
Individual warmbloods
Individual male horses
Horses in the Olympics
1992 animal births
2004 animal deaths